Paolo Agosteo (born 27 November 1908) was a professional Italian football player.

Honours
 Coppa Italia winner: 1936/37.

External links

1908 births
Year of death missing
Italian footballers
Footballers from Catania
Footballers from Sicily
Serie A players
F.C. Pavia players
Aurora Pro Patria 1919 players
Inter Milan players
Genoa C.F.C. players
S.S. Alba-Audace Roma players
Association football defenders